Akvsenti Gilauri (born 6 August 1979 in Tbilisi, Georgia) is a Georgian football defender.

Gilauri played for FC Lokomotivi Tbilisi in the 2001/02 Georgian Cup final, where the club lost on penalties.

References

1979 births
Living people
Footballers from Georgia (country)
Esteghlal F.C. players
Expatriate footballers in Iran
Pegah Gilan players
Association football defenders